Nikita Galrani (born 3 January 1992) is an Indian actress known for her works in Tamil and Malayalam films. Her commercially successful films include 1983 (2014), Vellimoonga (2014) and Darling (2015).

She starred in the commercially successful films like 1983 (2014), Vellimoonga (2014), Darling (2015), Velainu Vandhutta Vellaikaaran (2016) and Kalakalappu 2 (2018).

Early life and education
Nikki Galrani is the younger daughter of Manohar and Reshma Galrani born in Bangalore and is of Sindhi ancestry. She has an elder sister Sanjjanaa, who is also an actress.

Galrani was educated at Bishop Cotton Girls' School, Bangalore. Thereafter she did her PUC from Bishop Cotton Women's Christian College, Bangalore and later took up a course in fashion designing. She said that she did science in PUC because her parents and sister wanted her to become a doctor but they later let her pursue designing. She then did modelling and appeared in many advertisements. She resides in Chennai.

Career

Debut and breakthrough in Malayalam cinema (2014) 
Galrani started her film career with the Malayalam-language sports drama film 1983 (2014), written and directed by Abrid Shine, starring Nivin Pauly. Galrani played the character Manjula Sasidharan, a village girl and teenage lover of Rameshan (Pauly), who loves cricket more than anything. The film was critical and commercial success. She won awards from Filmfare, SIIMA and Vanitha as the best debut actress that year. She signed her first film to play the lead role in Ajith, the Kannada remake of the Tamil film Paiyaa, after an audition. Within three days, she had signed her next project, her first Tamil film, Yagavarayinum Naa Kaakka  and few weeks later, her first Malayalam film as well: 1983. In spite of being the last film she signed in 2013, 1983 released first in early 2014 and became her debut film and was her first major box office hit. She portrayed the role of Manjula Sasidharan, a rural village school girl  and said that the character was exactly the opposite of what she was in real life and that she had to sunbathe to get dark for the role. The film received critical acclaim and became a box office success, while Galrani went on to win the Filmfare Award for Best Female Debut – South for her performance.

A week later, Galrani had her second release, Nivin Pauly and Nazriya's Ohm Shanthi Oshaana, in which she had performed a cameo role. She had a third Malayalam release in 2014, Vellimoonga, in which she played a Christian nurse. The film, made on a budget of under  5 crores, went on to collect over  20 crores at the box office. At the end of the year, IBTimes called Galrani the most successful actress of 2014 in Malayalam cinema. Even before the release of her first Kannada film, she had been signed for three more Kannada projects as well: Jamboo Savari, a remake of the Telugu film Swamy Ra Ra, Obiraya  and Paravashanadenu, although the latter two were shelved midway. Ajith and Jamboo Savari released in quick succession in the second quarter of 2014. She had signed up Sharath A Haridaasan's Enthoru Bhagyam  and V. K. Prakash's next project, but had to opt out of both due to conflicting schedules.

Debut in Tamil and Telugu cinema (2015–2016) 
The delay of Yagavarayinum Naa Kaakka meant that the horror comedy Darling that she began shooting for much later became her debut Tamil release, which was a commercial success, collecting over  against a budget of 10 crore. It was successfully completed over 365-day at the Kollywood Industry, and went on to become successful at the Indian box-office. Galrani portrayed a spirit possessed girl "that you will be rooting for", and her performance was well received by critics, who stated that she gave a "good performance"  and had "played her part really well". Sify.com stated that "Nikki Galrani is cute and adorable, she is quite good at emotional sequences as well". Darling was followed by the releases of her two Malayalam films Ivan Maryadaraman and Oru Second Class Yathra. and the Kannada film Siddhartha that featured her in a pivotal role which she shot for in August 2014. In June 2015, Yagavarayinum Naa Kaakka was eventually released. Her character in the film, she said, was a "carbon copy of what I am in my real life". Sify.com stated that "Galrani’s infectious smile and energy is a major plus in the first half".

Galrani starred opposite Suresh Gopi in the Malayalam film Rudra Simhasanam. Her next Tamil film, Ko 2 was commercially successful at the Tamil box-office. And both of her Telugu language debut films performed fairly at the Tollywood box office. Galrani starred in Velainu Vandhutta Vellaikaaran (2016) a Tamil language film where she played a police officer opposite Vishnu Vishal. The film was financially successful. IndiaGlitz.com stated "Nikki added much more glamour to the film in songs and live entire the film by her stunt sequences". Galrani also made a cameo appearance in Shajahanum Pareekuttiyum. Her next Tamil film was opposite G. V. Prakash Kumar again, with Kadavul Irukaan Kumaru. Blasting News stated that "Nikki Galrani was spectacular, and the trio literally captured the soft part of audience's hearts".

2017–present 
In 2017, Galrani acted in Tamil film Motta Shiva Ketta Shiva opposite Raghava Lawrence followed by Maragadha Naanayam. She also acted in a Malayalam film Team 5 (2017) and successively four Tamil films Neruppu Da (2017), Hara Hara Mahadevaki (2017), Kalakalappu 2 (2018) and Pakka (2018). She also worked in Kannada entitled O Premave (2018). In 2019, she appeared in Tamil action films with Charlie Chaplin 2, Dev and Kee. In 2020, She made her comeback in Malayalam with the comedy Dhamaka.

Personal life 
On 24 March 2022, Galrani got engaged to her long-time boyfriend and actor Aadhi Pinisetty. The couple got married on 18 May 2022.

Filmography

Television

Awards and nominations

Notes

References

External links 

 

1992 births
Living people
Actresses from Bangalore
Female models from Bangalore
Sindhi people
Indian film actresses
Actresses in Malayalam cinema
Actresses in Tamil cinema
Actresses in Kannada cinema
Actresses in Telugu cinema
Filmfare Awards South winners
South Indian International Movie Awards winners
21st-century Indian actresses